Dennis Esposito (born 25 January 1988) is an Italian footballer who plays as a defender.

Career
Born in Milan, Lombardy, Esposito spent most of his youth career at Internazionale. He was signed by Inter at age 13 from Pro Sesto.

In July 2008 he was loaned to Reggiana. In the next season he left for Monza. In summer 2010 Monza signed him in co-ownership deal for a peppercorn fee. In June 2011 Inter bought back Esposito. In August, he left for Lecco, rejoining former Inter and Monza team-mate Domenico Maiese. On 31 January 2012 the loan was pre-matured.

References

External links
 
 FIGC 

Italian footballers
Italy youth international footballers
Inter Milan players
A.C. Reggiana 1919 players
A.C. Monza players
Calcio Lecco 1912 players
Association football central defenders
Footballers from Milan
1988 births
Living people